Protasovv is a Russian masculine surname, its feminine counterpart is Protasova. It may refer to:

Anna Protasova (1745–1826), Russian lady-in-waiting and noble
Igor Protasov (born 1964), Russian professional football coach and a former player
Nikolay Protasov (1798–1855), Russian general and noble
Oleh Protasov (born 1964), Ukrainian football player
Yevhen Protasov (born 1997), Ukrainian football player
Yuriy Protasov (born 1984), Ukrainian rally driver 

Russian-language surnames